Alana Suzanne DeLong (born c. 1949) is a Canadian politician who was the candidate for the Conservative Party of Canada in the Cowichan-Malahat-Langford federal riding in the 2019 general election. She is a former member of the Legislative Assembly of Alberta who represented the constituency of Calgary-Bow as a Progressive Conservative. She was first elected in 2001 and reelected in the 2004, 2008, and 2012 Alberta provincial elections. Alana DeLong did not run in 2015 general election.

Early life

DeLong was born in Nelson, British Columbia. She graduated from the University of British Columbia in 1970 with a Bachelor of Science degree in mathematics (honours) with a drama minor before going on to complete courses toward a Master of Computer Science degree at the University of Calgary. With more than 20 years experience in the information technology industry, DeLong has worked with many leading computer companies in Calgary including Barry W. Ramer & Partners Ltd. Canada's largest IBM PC VAR where she served as a leading Marketing Representative, Sterlingrock Systems Incorporated where she served as president and Sperry Univac where she worked as their first female computer mainframe salesperson. DeLong also holds the distinction of being the first female marketing manager with General Electric in Canada.

DeLong has long been an active community member. She served as president of Tuesday Nooners Toastmasters and extensively campaigned for the Cancer Fund, the Heart and Stroke Fund, the Canadian Red Cross Society, Flowers of Hope, and a number of municipal, provincial, and federal elections. DeLong has also drawn on her background in drama as an actress with Theatre Calgary, host of a television ski program, and singer with the Calgary Opera Chorus.

Political life

DeLong first sought public office in the 2001 provincial election in the constituency of Calgary-Bow. In that election, DeLong received 64% of the vote. She was subsequently reelected in 2004 with a share of 48% and again in 2008 when she earned 45% of the vote.

During the same-sex marriage debate in December 2004, DeLong joined the majority of Progressive Conservative caucus in speaking against same sex marriage rights and supported a legal challenge following Reference Re Same-Sex Marriage and the introduction of Bill C-38 by the Government of Canada.

DeLong intended to run as a candidate in the 2006 Progressive Conservative Leadership convention but decided against seeking the position prior to the nomination deadline. Up until the point of her departure from the race, she was the only female seeking the leadership.

In addition to her role as an MLA, DeLong has been a member of a number of committees. She has served in the role of chair of the Standing Committee on Private Bills, the Nomination Review Committee of the Ministers Seniors Service Awards, and of the Information and Communications Technology (ICT) and SuperNet Committee, as well as the position of vice-chair of the Official Song Committee. DeLong has also served on the Regulatory Review Steering Committee, the Provincial Archives of Alberta Advisory Board, the Cabinet Policy Committee on Government Services, the Standing Committee on Public Accounts Committee, the Standing Policy Committee on Justice and Government Services, and the Standing Policy Committee on Law and Regulations and Public Accounts. As well, she has served as a member of a number of MLA Review Committees, including the MLA Committee to Review the Assured Income for the Severely Handicapped (AISH) Program, the MLA Committee to Review Low-Income Programs in Alberta, the MLA Committee to Review Marketing Tourism, the MLA Committee to Review Freedom of Information Practices, and the MLA Committee to Review the Select Conflicts of Interest Act.

DeLong served as a member of the Cabinet Policy Committee on Community Services, the Standing Committee on Privileges and Elections, Standing Orders and Printing, and the Standing Committee on the Alberta Heritage Savings Trust Fund. She also serves as co-chair of the Alberta Life Sciences Institute (ALSI) Board.

Personal life

DeLong is married to Robert Spencer. She has two grown children, Samantha and James. She lived in the community of Bowness for more than 30 years and designed the log home she lives in with her family. DeLong returned to her native home of British Columbia in April 2015 and now lives on Thetis Island in the Southern Gulf Islands.

Electoral record

References

External links

 Alana DeLong's web page

Year of birth missing (living people)
Progressive Conservative Association of Alberta MLAs
Canadian people of Dutch descent
Living people
People from Nelson, British Columbia
Women MLAs in Alberta
21st-century Canadian politicians
21st-century Canadian women politicians
British Columbia Liberal Party candidates in British Columbia provincial elections